Hoschton  is a city in Jackson County, Georgia, United States. The population was 1,377 at the 2010 census. As of 2018 the estimated population was 1,916.

History
The Georgia General Assembly incorporated the city in 1891 as the Town of Hoschton. The community was named after Russell A. Hosch, a local merchant.

Geography
It is bordered to the north by the city of Braselton. Georgia State Route 53 runs through the center of town, leading northwest  to Oakwood and south  to Winder.

Water bodies in Hoschton drain west and east into tributaries of the Mulberry River, part of the Oconee River watershed.

The ZIP Code for Hoschton, 30548, goes well beyond the city limits and covers part of four counties: Jackson, Gwinnett, Hall, and Barrow. Hoschton's ZIP Code is used within about 40 percent of the Braselton town limits.

Demographics

As of the census of 2000, there were 1,070 people, 388 households, and 304 families residing in the city. The racial makeup of the city was 93.36% White, 4.86% African American, 0.19% Native American, 0.09% Asian, 0.28% from other races, and 1.21% from two or more races. Hispanic or Latino of any race were 1.40% of the population. As of July 2009 the population is estimated at 1,612.

There were 388 households, out of which 37.4% had children under the age of 18 living with them, 64.2% were married couples living together, 10.8% had a female householder with no husband present, and 21.4% were non-families. 17.8% of all households were made up of individuals, and 5.7% had someone living alone who was 65 years of age or older.  The average household size was 2.76 and the average family size was 3.12.

In the city, the population was spread out, with 28.3% under the age of 18, 8.0% from 18 to 24, 30.5% from 25 to 44, 22.6% from 45 to 64, and 10.6% who were 65 years of age or older.  The median age was 34 years. For every 100 females, there were 95.3 males.  For every 100 females age 18 and over, there were 95.2 males.

The median income for a household in the city was $50,625, and the median income for a family was $57,917. Males had a median income of $40,000 versus $27,153 for females. The per capita income for the city was $22,416.  About 9.5% of families and 11.5% of the population were below the poverty line, including 12.5% of those under age 18 and 18.8% of those age 65 or over.

References

External links
 City of Hoschton official website
 Hoschton Train Depot historical marker
 Postcard of depot in Mulberry, Jackson County, Georgia, ca. 1910 from Vanishing Georgia, Georgia Archives, Digital Library of Georgia.

Cities in Georgia (U.S. state)
Cities in Jackson County, Georgia